The Municipality of Granville was a local government area in the Western region of Sydney, New South Wales, Australia. The municipality was proclaimed as the Borough of Granville on 20 January 1885. It included the modern suburbs of Granville, South Granville, Camellia, Rosehill, Clyde and parts of Harris Park, Guildford and Merrylands. From 1 January 1949, the council was amalgamated into the City of Parramatta, with the passing of the Local Government (Areas) Act 1948.

Council history

Early years and development
The area was first incorporated on 20 January 1885, when the Governor of New South Wales, Lord Augustus Loftus, proclaimed the "Borough of Granville". Alban Gee was appointed the first returning officer for the council election on 18 March 1885, with nine aldermen elected at-large.

The prominent conveyancer and local landowner behind Granville's incorporation, John Nobbs, was elected the first mayor, and John Southwood Beach was appointed first Town Clerk at the Council's first meeting on 27 March 1885. Although the first council was elected at-large, from 25 May 1887 the council was divided into three wards: East, North and West. South Ward was added on 29 December 1891, bringing the number of aldermen to twelve. Granville's central location for the railways meant that industrial development became more important to the area, with an 1888 profile of the borough noting "A very large number of important industries, employing in the aggregate quite an army of mechanics, exists in the borough."

Effective 26 February 1906, a five square kilometre area bounded by Prospect and Sherwood to the west (the Southern Rail line) and Auburn to the east (Duck River), and south to the Sydney water supply pipeline forming the northern boundary of Bankstown, was added to the South Ward. From 28 December 1906, following the passing of the Local Government Act, 1906, the council was renamed as the "Municipality of Granville". On 3 May 1922, the ward system was abolished.

Council seat
Granville Borough Council first met in temporary premises, including at the 1884 Granville School of Arts on Good Street. Soon however, a site in the Lea Estate facing Carlton Street was purchased for a Town Hall, with work commencing in 1888. Architect Charles Assinder Harding of Sydney designed the Town Hall, and Banks & Whitehurst were the contractors.

The foundation stone was laid by John Nobbs on 5 September 1888 and was officially opened on 16 January 1889. An auditorium was added to the Town Hall in 1900, designed by James Whitmore Hill of Parramatta, and officially opened on 18 December 1900 by the Secretary for Public Works, E. W. O'Sullivan.

Later history
By the end of the Second World War, the NSW Government had realised that its ideas of infrastructure expansion could not be effected by the present system of the patchwork of small municipal councils across Sydney and the Minister for Local Government, Joseph Cahill, following the recommendations of the 1945–46 Clancy Royal Commission on Local Government Boundaries, passed a bill in 1948 that abolished a significant number of those councils. Under the Local Government (Areas) Act 1948 (effective 1 January 1949), Granville Municipal Council merged with the municipalities of Parramatta, Ermington & Rydalmere and Dundas to form the new City of Parramatta.

The Granville municipality became "Granville Ward", returning six aldermen. The regular council meetings of the new Parramatta City were held at the Granville Town Hall from 1948 until 1958, when the new Parramatta administration centre opened. In 1995 a reorganisation of Parramatta's wards resulted in Granville Ward being renamed "Woodville Ward" after Woodville Road while the former Granville Municipality suburbs of Harris Park, Rosehill, Telopea, and northern sections of Granville and Clyde, were moved into the Elizabeth Macarthur Ward. From 12 May 2016, the Woodville Ward became part of the new Cumberland Council.

Mayors

Town Clerks

References

Further reading

Lidcombe
Granville
Granville
Granville